Italy (ITA) has competed at the European Indoor Athletics Championships since first edition the 1966 European Indoor Games, Italians athletes have won a total of 100 medals.

Summary
Italians have won 21 titles in the men's field and 13 in the women's field.

Men's multiple medallists are: Eddy Ottoz (3 gold); Fabrizio Donato (1 gold, 2 silver); Giovanni De Benedictis (1 gold, 1 silver, 1 bronze); Giovanni Evangelisti (1 silver, 2 bronze); Stefano Tilli (2 gold); Claudio Licciardello (1 gold, 1 silver); Maurizio Damilano and Gianmarco Tamberi (1 gold, 1 silver); Renato Dionisi (1 gold, 1 bronze); Pierfrancesco Pavoni (2 silver); Stefano Malinverni and Paolo Dal Molin (1 silver, 1 bronze); Ashraf Saber and Antonio Ullo (1 silver, 1 bronze).

Women's multiple medallists are: Sara Simeoni (4 gold); Agnese Possamai (3 gold, 1 silver); Ileana Salvador (3 silver); Rita Bottiglieri (1 silver, 2 bronze); Assunta Legnante and Antonietta Di Martino (1 gold, 1 silver); Annarita Sidoti and  Simona La Mantia (1 gold, 1 bronze); Carla Barbarino and Patrizia Spuri (1 silver, 1 bronze).

Medals

Top eight
Incomplete list, to be added first four editions of the European Indoor Games.

Oldest competitors
Men
Fabrizio Donato, 42 years 171 days triple jump 2019

Women
Carla Barbarino, 34 years 291 days (4 × 400 metres relay in 2002)
Chiara Bazzoni, 34 years, 241 days silver medal (4 × 400 metres relay in 2019)

See also
Athletics in Italy
Italy national athletics team
Italy at the European Athletics Championships

References

External links
 European Athletic Association
 FIDAL - Federazione Italiana Di Atletica Leggera

 
Athletics in Italy
Nations at the European Athletics Indoor Championships